Luc Marijinissen (born 9 January 2003) is a Dutch footballer who currently plays as a defender for NAC Breda.

Marijinissen started with NAC Breda at just 10 years old and went through the entire youth academy before making his professional debut as a substitute in the Eerste Divisie against MVV on 4 March 2022, before making his first start a week later at his home ground in the Eerie Divisie against De Graafschap. 
Shortly after this, he signed his first professional contract with NAC Breda.

References

External links

2003 births
Living people
Dutch footballers
Association football midfielders
NAC Breda players
Eerste Divisie players